Tap Root Manuscript is the sixth studio album recorded by Neil Diamond, released in October 1970. It was one of the most experimental albums he ever recorded, featuring rock music fused with prominent African sounds and instruments. The album was a commercial success, going Gold in three months, eventually certified Platinum by the RIAA. The album's success was powered primarily by "Cracklin' Rosie", his first number 1 single, with help from Diamond's cover of "He Ain't Heavy, He's My Brother", which rose to number 20. The latter song had been a major hit for the Hollies the previous year.

While the first side of the LP contained five pop rock songs, Side Two was a conceptual suite of related songs expressing an African theme, titled "The African Trilogy". Within this suite was the song "Soolaimon", which rose to number 30 in the US. The 19-minute suite saw African folk styles twined with blues and gospel elements to create what Diamond called "a folk ballet". This effort predates many Western pop artists' interest in world music, for instance Peter Gabriel's 1980 founding of World of Music, Arts and Dance (WOMAD), and the African-influenced album Graceland by Paul Simon in 1986. Tap Root Manuscript was one of the most novel experimental recording projects of its time, and the Uni label, to which Diamond was then under contract, initially was not sure whether it would be commercially viable.

Track listing
All selections written and composed by Neil Diamond except "He Ain't Heavy, He's My Brother," written and composed by Bob Russell and Bobby Scott.

References

External links
Neil Diamond's Official Website
Record Label

Neil Diamond albums
1970 albums
Uni Records albums
MCA Records albums
Albums arranged by Marty Paich
Albums arranged by Lee Holdridge
Albums produced by Tom Catalano